Antipodes in Shoes (1958) is a poetry collection by Australian poet Geoffrey Dutton.  It won the Grace Leven Prize for Poetry in 1958.

The collection consists of 51 poems, most of which were previously published in various Australian poetry publications.

Contents

Critical reception 
Reviewing the collection in The Bulletin, "D.S." called the collection "an unusual contribution to Australian poetry" in that it dealt with travels in Europe. They went on: "In its assured and thoughtful report on his Grand Tour – all over England, Ireland and the Continent – it reminds you of the spacious days when Byron, Wordsworth and Matthew Arnold similarly meditated on their travels; and it is in line with the more recent travel-poems of Louis MacNiece and some of the Americans...It is thoroughly cultivated poetry."

Gustav Cross, in The Sydney Morning Herald noted that this collection "shows that if he [Dutton] is not yet quite among the foremost of Australia's poets he is at any rate treading hard on their heels. His title and some of the poems invite comparison with Andrew Marvell. Surprisingly, this is less damaging than one would imagine, for few modern poets have caught the tone and movement of Marvell half so well."

Notes 
 The contents of this collection are grouped under the following section headers: Northern (pp11-34), Southern (pp 37-61), Satirical (pp 65-76), People in Places (pp 79-89).

See also
 1958 in Australian literature

References

Australian poetry collections
1958 books